Lorenzo Coleman (September 9, 1975 −November 24, 2013) was an American basketball player.

College career
Coleman played college basketball for Tennessee Tech for four years, and had 437 blocks in 114 games.

Professional career
In the 2001 NBDL Supplemental Draft, Coleman was drafted first overall by the Roanoke Dazzle. He played 46 games for Roanoke in 2001–02 and led the NBDL in field goal percentage, at .606.

Coleman played for the Harlem Globetrotters in 2002.

Death
Coleman died on November 24, 2013 at the age of 38 after suffering an aortic aneurysm a couple of weeks earlier.

See also
List of NCAA Division I men's basketball career blocks leaders

References

1975 births
2013 deaths
American expatriate basketball people in Bulgaria
American expatriate basketball people in China
American expatriate basketball people in Greece
American expatriate basketball people in the Philippines
American expatriate basketball people in Syria
American expatriate basketball people in Uruguay
Centers (basketball)
Gymnastikos S. Larissas B.C. players
Harlem Globetrotters players
Irakleio B.C. players
Roanoke Dazzle players
Tennessee Tech Golden Eagles men's basketball players
Place of birth missing
American men's basketball players
Philippine Basketball Association imports
Magnolia Hotshots players